William Gillard 1812 – 1897

Born in Bristol to a well-known family of stonemasons, William Gillard was apprenticed at 14 for six years to a Bristol carver and gilder, but at 18 he had already exhibited a painting in Ireland, a country he fell in love with and where he would spend long periods working as a painter and a modeller of ceramic figures.

His paintings cover a wide range of subjects, most of them on a fairly small canvas and executed either in water colours, or, predominantly, in oils: genre pictures, portraits, landscapes, and more increasingly in later life, still lifes and paintings of dogs, in which genre he became a specialist. In early years he liked to treat the same subject both as a painting and as a ceramic model. It is not yet known if he continued this practice, as only one later ceramic work has been traced, namely the piece cited by L Lewellyn Jewitt in The Ceramic Art of Great Britain : "Repentance, Faith and Resignation modelled by Mr. Gillard."

In 1876 he left Ireland for good, returning first to Liverpool, a city he had long connections with, then alternating between Chester and The Potteries. He died in Stoke-on-Trent in January 1897, having exhibited consistently in both Ireland (chiefly in Dublin) and in Birmingham for decades.

References

External links
 Nine Letters from an Artist The Families of William Gillard, Joan M Richmond, Porphyrogenitus 2015. . 
 

1812 births
1897 deaths
Artists from Bristol